Saint Jude Catholic School (SJCS), is a private  Catholic coeducational basic education institution run by the Philippine Central Province of the Society of the Divine Word in the district of San Miguel in Manila, Philippines. It is located adjacent to Malacañang Palace. It offers trilingual education in English, Mandarin Chinese, and Filipino. The coeducational school offers Nursery, Preparatory, Elementary (Grade 1 to Grade 6), Junior High School (Grade 7 to Grade 10) and Pre-University: Senior High School (Grade 11 to Grade 12) programs and International Baccalaureate Diploma Programme (IBDP). It is the oldest of the two Judenite institutions in the country. The school draws inspiration from the life and works of the institution's patron saint, Saint Jude Thaddeus. The school was founded by 3 Chinese priests, Fr. Peter Tsao, SVD  and Fr. Peter Yang, SVD, and later joined by Fr.Charles Tchou who died on November 7, 2008.

Campus
The Saint Jude Catholic School campus in the district of San Miguel in Manila is composed of four buildings on a  lot. These include the Prep School Building, the S.J. Building, the Fr. Peter Yang Building and the new Fu Shen Fu Building. The National Shrine of Saint Jude Thaddeus is located within the school's campus.

Sports facilities on campus include a basketball stadium, badminton and volleyball courts, covered courts, ping-pong tables and a gym. The basketball stadium has a seating capability of 1,200 people and a regular-sized court that can be used for sporting events, and other activities. The new Fu Shen Fu Building was finished in December 2006. It houses a volleyball court and three badminton courts, a fully air-conditioned chapel, three computer labs, a dance practice facility, and also includes the residences of the priests/principals.

History
Saint Jude Catholic School was opened in July 1963 by Fr. Peter Yang, SVD, to reach out to the Chinese community of Manila and shepherd them into God's fold. Its early years saw an enrollment of 192 boys and girls in the preschool and first grade levels taught by nine teachers:  Ms. Rosa Chua (Esteban), Ms. Josefina Uy (Tan), Ms. Angelina Onglatco, Ms. Rogracia Sunga, Ms. Corazon Sevilla, Ms. Amelita Simon and others.

Academics

Admission 
Admission to Saint Jude Catholic School is competitive. All students enter Saint Jude as nursery students. The acceptance rate is around 12%. Transfer students are accepted, but are required to undergo an entrance examination.

Pre-University Programs 
Saint Jude Catholic School offers two pre-university programs: Senior High School and the International Baccalaureate Diploma Programme

Senior High School Education 
Saint Jude Catholic School offers Senior High School education. They offer academic strands such as ABM (Accountancy and Business Management), STEM specialized in Engineering (Science, Technology, Engineering and Mathematics), STEM specialized in Biology, and HUMSS (Humanities and Social Sciences).

International Baccalaureate Diploma Programme 
Saint Jude Catholic School is an IB World School and offers the Diploma Programme (DP).

Activities 
Saint Jude Catholic School activity groups include Christian Communities (Knights of the Altar Society, Christian Life Community, Judenites Chorale Ensemble, the St. Jude Chapter of the Filipino-Chinese Catholic Youth, a national organization), Student Governments (Student Councils), Performance Groups (Cheerleading Squad, Chinese Glee club, Drama Guild, Dance Troupe), Publications (The Judenites), and Sport teams (Basketball, Volleyball, Swimming, Table Tennis). Saint Jude also has the only Drum, Bugle and Marimba Corps in all the Filipino-Chinese Schools. The students can join Citizens Army Training (CAT) and the Saint Jude Scouting Movement (SJSM).

Sportsfest 

Sportsfest is an activity wherein high school students compete in sports and cheering. Usually occurring after the third quarter periodical exams, some of the sports that can be joined are badminton (singles and doubles), ping-pong, chess, swimming, volleyball, etc. Each sport is divided into Division A and Division B, with varsity members joining the former and barred from the latter for equality's sake.

Sports

The school offers athletics programs for members of its community.

Every year, the SJ alumni compete in sport tournaments. Everyone, including the public, may use Saint Jude's sports facilities upon obtaining permission to do so from the school.

Basketball 
The SJCS Basketball Team competes in different basketball league such as the MMTLBA: FCAAF; MSSA; MASA; FCABL and the PCYAA also known as the Ching Yuen.

Badminton 
The Saint Jude Badminton team has been the three-time defending champions of the Metropolitan Amateur Sports Association (MASA).

Swimming 
The Saint Jude swimming team is the Green Mariners. The Green Mariners have expanded their team to a club, the Manila Torpedoes. The Manila Torpedoes Club competed with swimming teams around NCR and the other regions; the team garnered many awards and championships in the duration of its existence as a team.

Taekwondo 
The school has a Taekwondo team that first competed in 2008 in the Milo Little Olympics (for the grade school students), but lost. In 2008, also in Milo Little Olympics (for the HS students), three students competed and two were medalists, one silver medal and a bronze medal. They also joined a Hwoarang-Do competition where everyone got a medal.

In the 2009 Milo Little Olympics (for HS students), the school won three bronze medals.  They joined the 41st WNCAA (for HS students) in 2011 and won 2 gold medals and 1 silver.

Cheering 
The Saint Jude Cheering Squadron are the five-time defending champions of the Tiong Lian Cheering Competition.

Volleyball 
The volleyball team of the High School Boys Division has joined many competitions mainly Milo Little Olympics, MASA, and the Chinese Federation.

Football 
The school has two teams, the girls' team and the boys' team. The boys team is categorized by age and department. The U15 team have won multiple competitions and they attained a silver in the 75th WNCAA held in 2016. The girls' team is new.

Table Tennis 
The Saint Jude Table Tennis team has won several championships in the Filipino Chinese inter-school competitions.

Notable alumni
Edwin Lacierda ('79) - Presidential Spokesman and member of the three-man Communications Group of the Noynoy Aquino administration holding the rank of Cabinet Secretary, served as legal counsel and co-convenor of the civil society group, The Black and White Movement
Federico Sandoval II ('80) - three-term Congressman from the City of Malabon, Municipality of Navotas
Tim Yap ('94) - Entrepreneur / TV Show Host
Carmela Antoinette Sio Lao - Silver medalist at International Mathematical Olympiad

References

External links

 Official website
 Official website of the Saint Jude Catholic School Alumni Association
 Official SJCS Batch '82 website
 Archive of photos
 National Shrine of St. Jude Thaddeus

Chinese-language schools in Manila
International Baccalaureate schools in the Philippines
Education in San Miguel, Manila
Catholic elementary schools in Manila
Catholic secondary schools in Manila
Divine Word Missionaries Order
Educational institutions established in 1963
1963 establishments in the Philippines